Protoginella laseroni is a species of sea snail, a marine gastropod mollusk in the family Marginellidae, the margin snails.

Description
The length of the shell attains 5.55 mm.

Distribution
This marine species occurs off New Caledonia.

References

 Boyer F. (2001). Espèces nouvelles de Marginellidae du niveau bathyal de la Nouvelle-Calédonie. Novapex 2(4): 157-169 

Marginellidae
Gastropods described in 2001